Sobrato Office Tower is a 17-story, class-A office building located at 488 Almaden Boulevard in San Jose, California. It is the fourth tallest building in the city. The building was completed in 2002 by the Sobrato Organization and remained unoccupied for nine years. Sobrato sold the building for $135 million to BEA Systems in 2007, which was itself later purchased by the building's present owner, Oracle.

Shortly after its headquarters moved to Austin from Redwood Shores, in 2021, Oracle sold off its San Jose tower for $155 million, making a profit of nearly $20 million over the course of its 13 year ownership.

History
Since its $138.5 million assessment in 2007, the assessed value of the building has fallen to $57 million by 2011.

At different times, the City of San Jose, Nvidia, Sony, and BEA were each noted publicly to be negotiating to lease space in the building but none of those reported negotiations resulted in a tenancy.

Criticism of the building and possible reasons for its inability to attract tenants have often focused on its location being too far from downtown San Jose.

On November 17, 2010, it was announced that PricewaterhouseCoopers would lease  on eight floors (levels 10-17) of the tower beginning June 2011, thus leaving their  10 Almaden Boulevard location in San Jose.

References

External links 
 Sobrato Organization

Skyscraper office buildings in San Jose, California
Office buildings completed in 2002